Sara Elizabeth Pastrana (born 12 March 1999) is a Honduran swimmer. She competed in the women's 200 metre freestyle event at the 2016 Summer Olympics.

In 2019, she represented Honduras at the 2019 World Aquatics Championships held in Gwangju, South Korea. She competed in the women's 200 metre freestyle and women's 400 metre freestyle events. In the 200 metre event she did not advance to compete in the semi-finals and in the 400 metre event she did not advance to compete in the final.

References

External links
 

1999 births
Living people
Honduran female swimmers
Olympic swimmers of Honduras
Swimmers at the 2016 Summer Olympics
Place of birth missing (living people)
Swimmers at the 2019 Pan American Games
Honduran female freestyle swimmers
Pan American Games competitors for Honduras
21st-century Honduran women